Kalavi (also Romanized as Kalāvī; also known as Talāvī) is a village in Kuh Hamayi Rural District, Rud Ab District, Sabzevar County, Razavi Khorasan Province, Iran. At the 2006 census, its population was 69, in 22 families.

References 

Populated places in Sabzevar County